Clypeobarbus is a genus of small cyprinid fishes native to Africa. Most species are restricted to the Congo River Basin, but C. pleuropholis is also found in the Chad Basin, while C. bellcrossi is from the Zambezi and C. hypsolepis is from rivers in Western Africa.

Species
There are currently 9 recognized species in this genus:

 Clypeobarbus bellcrossi (R. A. Jubb, 1965) (Gorgeous barb)
 Clypeobarbus bomokandi (G. S. Myers, 1924)
 Clypeobarbus breviclipeus Stiassny & Sakharova, 2016 
 Clypeobarbus congicus (Boulenger, 1899) (Congo barb)
 Clypeobarbus hypsolepis (Daget, 1959)
 Clypeobarbus matthesi (Poll & J. P. Gosse, 1963) 
 Clypeobarbus pleuropholis (Boulenger, 1899)
 Clypeobarbus pseudognathodon (Boulenger, 1915)
 Clypeobarbus schoutedeni (Poll & J. G. Lambert, 1961)

References

 
Fish of Africa